Ypthima masakii is a butterfly in the family Nymphalidae (subfamily Satyrinae). It is endemic to Japan. The type locality is on the Loochoo Islands.

References

masakii
Butterflies described in 1947